Olimpiyat is an underground rapid transit station in Başakşehir, Istanbul and is the northern terminus of the M9 line of the Istanbul Metro. It was first opened as part of M3 but in 2021 it was made a part of M9. It is located just north of the Atatürk Olympic Stadium but within the Olympic stadium complex. The station consists of two island platforms servicing three tracks. West of the station lies the Olimpiyat Yard, which houses the dispatcher of the M3 and the M9 line.

Olimpiyat station was opened on 22 November 2013.

Nearby Places of Interest
Atatürk Olympic Stadium - The Largest stadium in Turkey.

References

Istanbul metro stations
Başakşehir
Railway stations opened in 2013
2013 establishments in Turkey
Rapid transit stations under construction in Turkey